Sint-Kruis is a suburb of Bruges in the province of West Flanders in Belgium.

Gallery

External links
brugge.be

Sub-municipalities of Bruges
Populated places in West Flanders